North Sugar Creek Township is a township in Randolph County, in the U.S. state of Missouri.

North Sugar Creek Township takes its name from Sugar Creek.

References

Townships in Missouri
Townships in Randolph County, Missouri